Harvey is a railway point on the Canadian National Railway located in Tête Jaune Cache, British Columbia, approximately 18 km north of Valemount, British Columbia.

References
BCGNIS Geographical Name Query
Tête Jaune Cache, British Columbia

Populated places in the Regional District of Fraser-Fort George
Railway points in the Regional District of Fraser-Fort George
Canadian National Railway stations in British Columbia